Wells Glacier is a glacier  west of Cape Brooks, flowing north into New Bedford Inlet in Palmer Land. Mapped by United States Geological Survey (USGS) from ground surveys and U.S. Navy air photos, 1961–67. Named by Advisory Committee on Antarctic Names (US-ACAN) for James T. Wells, storekeeper with the South Pole Station winter party in 1967.

Glaciers of Palmer Land